Mandholi Kalan, next to Mandholi Khurd, Rambass (part of Mandholi Kalan) situated 5 km from Mandholi Gopalwas, Kasni Kalan and Isharwal, is a village and administrative unit with a democratically elected panchayat samiti (local council) in the Loharu (Vidhan Sabha constituency), Loharu Tehsil of Bhiwani District under Bhiwani-Mahendragarh Lok Sabha constituency and Hisar Division of Haryana state.

History

Bidhwan Jaglan Zail and Jaglan Lambardari

Bidhwan is seat of the former Jaglan Zail that was headed by the Ghanghas from influential Jaglan clan who during the British Raj ruled over four revenue villages of Princely state called Loharu State. Descendants of whom still live in the village and their descendant Surender Singh Jaglan still holds the position of Lambardar of these villages. Currently, these four villages of Bidhwan (बिधवाण), Kalali (कलाली), Mandholi Khurd  (मंढोली खुर्द) and Mandholi Kalan (मंढोलीकलां) lie in Bhiwani district.

Nearby archaeological sites
Nearby Indus Valley civilization archaeological sites are Banawali, Lohari Ragho, Masudpur, Rakhigarhi, Siswal all with Hissar district as well as Burj and Bhirrana and Kunal and Balu in Fatehabad and Mitathal and Naurangabad in Bhiwani district. Another archaeological site is Agroha Mound.

Administration
Currently, it is under Bhiwani Zilla Panchayat and has its own unreserved Gram Panchayat under Gram Panchayat Smiti. There is a Patwari (government land record officer), an ADO (Agriculture Development Officer), a rural health officer, and an Anganbadi worker.

Transportation
It is well connected by the paved bitumen road. It lies from 9 km Jhumpa Khurd, 18 km  Bahal, 21 km Siwani, 29  Rajgarh (Rajasthan), 33  Kairu, 55 km Hissar, 57 km Hansi, 49 km Pilani, 50 km from Bhiwani, 163 km Delhi and 282 km from state capital Chandigarh.

Train connectivity
Nearest train stations are 9 km Jhumpa Khurd, 18 km  Bahal, 21 km Siwani, 29  Rajgarh.

Airport connectivity
Currently no commercial flights from this airport.

See also

mandholi  kalan(rambass)
 Bidhwan
 Badya Jattan
 Barwas
 Mandholi Khurd
 Kanwari
 Zaildar
 List of Zaildars by Zail

References

External links
 Google location map
 Bhiwani District Website

Villages in Bhiwani district
Archaeological sites in Haryana